The zebra oto or tiger oto (Otocinclus cocama) is a fish of the genus Otocinclus of the family Loricariidae that originates from Peru.

Taxonomy
The zebra oto was described in 2004 from a tributary of the Río Ucayali in Peru. Its closest relatives appear to be O. huaorani, O. bororo, O. mariae, and O. mura, as well as the more recently described species O. batmani.

Distribution and habitat
This fish is found in Peru in the Ucayali River and possibly Marañón River as well. These fish are found in mid-sized creeks with clear water. It may also be found in small ponds. They associate with marginal vegetation.

Appearance and anatomy
The zebra oto has a general body-shape like other Otocinclus species. They are small, have a suckermouth, and have armor on their bodies.

The zebra oto can be distinguished from all other members of this genus by its vertical stripe-like blotches and its complete lateral line. The zebra oto has the highest number of teeth of any species of Otocinclus. The W mark on its caudal fin distinguishes this fish from all others except for O. batmani. The zebra oto reaches about 4.4 cm (1.7 in) in SL, though the males are smaller.

Status 
The zebra oto is listed as endangered by the IUCN Red List due to its limited range and overexploitation for the aquarium trade. Additionally, it is not protected in any part of its range, nor is it listed on CITES. The species has a decreasing population trend in the wild.

In the aquarium
The zebra oto has been for sale in the aquarium trade since the early 1990s. It has been popular since at least 2000. They are an occasionally seen species, and are bred in Asia in good numbers.

See also
List of freshwater aquarium fish species

References 
 

Hypoptopomatini
Freshwater fish of Peru
Taxa named by Roberto Esser dos Reis
Fish described in 2004